Parbhani Junction railway station (railway code PBN) located in Parbhani. It is the main railway station of Parbhani City & District.  The station comes under Nanded railway division. It is an A-1 Category Station. The station is situated on Secunderabad–Manmad section of South Central Railway zone. The city has good connectivity to major cities of Maharashtra such as Aurangabad, Mumbai, Nagpur, Pune, Nanded, Nashik, Kolhapur, Shirdi, Pandharpur. It is also well connected to other Indian cities like New Delhi, Hyderabad, Visakhapatnam, Secunderabad, Bangalore, Bhopal, Surat, Ahmedabad, Okha, Amritsar, Agra, Jaipur, Chandigarh, Tirupati, Rameswaram.
Sachkhand Express, Nagarsol-Narsapur Express, Devagiri Express, Marathwada Sampark Kranti Express, Hazur Sahib Nanded-Panvel Express, Tirupati Weekly Express, Rameswaram Weekly Express are some important trains passing through here and these trains connect this city with various cities mentioned above

Trains 

Some of the trains that call on Parbhani Junction are:

 Panvel–Hazur Sahib Nanded Express
 Parbhani–Hyderabad Passenger
 Parbhani–Nanded Passenger
 Ajanta Express
 Adilabad Parli Vaijnath Passenger (unreserved)
 Ajmer–Hazur Sahib Nanded SpecialFare Special
 Ajmer–Hyderabad SpecialFare Urs Special
 Ajmer–Hyderabad Express
 Lokmanya Tilak Terminus–Ajni Express (via Aurangabad)
 Akola Parli Vaijnath Passenger (unreserved)
 Pune–Amravati Express
 Aurangabad–Renigunta Express
 Aurangabad–Hazur Sahib Nanded Express
 Aurangabad-Hyderabad Passenger
 Nagpur–CSMT Kolhapur Express
 Chennai–Nagarsol Express
 Daund–Hazur Sahib Nanded Passenger
 Deekshabhoomi Express
 Devagiri Express
 Marathwada Express
 Hazur Sahib Nanded–Bangalore City Express
 Hazur Sahib Nanded–Ajmer Gokripa Mahotsav Special
 Lokmanya Tilak Terminus–Hazur Sahib Nanded Express (via Latur)
 Pune–Nanded Superfast Express (via Manmad)
Hazur Sahib Nanded–Pune Express (via Latur)
 Hyderabad–Purna Passenger (unreserved)
 Kacheguda–Manmad Passenger (unreserved)
 Sainagar Shirdi–Kakinada Port Express
 Kazipet–Mumbai LTT Special
 Lokmanya Tilak Terminus–Karimnagar Express
 Nagarsol–Nanded Passenger (unreserved)
 Narasapur–Nagarsol Express (via Guntur)
 Narasapur–Nagarsol Express (via Warangal)
 Nagarsol–Tirupati Special Fare (via Guntur)
 Nandigram Express
 Nizamabad–Pandharpur Passenger
 Nizamabad–Pune Passenger
 Rameswaram–Okha Express
 Parbhani–Nanded Passenger (unreserved)
 Parli Vaijnath–Purna Passenger (unreserved)
 Sachkhand Express
 Tirupati–Sainagar Shirdi Express
 Sainagar Shirdi–Secunderabad Express
 Sainagar Shirdi–Visakhapatnam Express
 Sainagar Shirdi–Vijayawada Express
 Tapovan Express

References

Railway stations in Parbhani district
Nanded railway division